Jeannette Lee, Jeanette Lee, or Jennette Lee may refer to:

 Jeannette Lee, British executive at Rough Trade Records, and former bandmember of Public Image Ltd
 Jeannette H. Lee (formerly Jeannette Lee White), Korean-American businesswoman
 Jeanette Lee, Korean-American professional pool player
 Jennette Lee (1860–1951), American writer and academic

See also 
 Janet Lee (disambiguation)
 Jean Lee (disambiguation)